William Terrence McGrattan (born 19 September 1956) is the eighth and current bishop of the Diocese of Calgary. He was an auxiliary bishop for the Archdiocese of Toronto and titular bishop of Furnos Minor before being appointed Bishop of the Diocese of Peterborough.

Biography
He was born in London, Ontario, Canada. He received a Bachelor of Engineering Science in Chemical Engineering (BESc) from the University of Western Ontario, London, Ontario in 1979. In 1987, he obtained a Master of Divinity (M.Div.) from St. Peter's Seminary. McGrattan was ordained to the priesthood on 2 May 1987 for the Diocese of London by Bishop John Michael Sherlock.

After ordination, Father McGrattan served three years as associate pastor at St. Joseph's Parish in Chatham, Ontario. He then continued in theology in Rome, where in 1992 he earned a Licentiate in Fundamental Moral Theology (S.T.L.) from the Pontificia Universita Gregoriana. He became a member of the faculty at St. Peter's Seminary in London, Ontario, where he served as dean of theology, becoming rector in 1997.

Bishop
On 6 November 2009 McGrattan was appointed by Pope Benedict XVI as one of two new auxiliary bishops for the Archdiocese of Toronto along with Bishop Nguyen. McGrattan was ordained Titular Bishop of Furnos Minor on 12 January 2010 at St. Peter's Cathedral Basilica in London, Ontario. Bishop McGrattan took as his motto ""Habe Fiduciam in Domino" (Trust in the Lord) from Proverbs 3:5.

As Auxiliary Bishop of Toronto, McGrattan had responsibility for the Central Region that includes seventy-one parishes in the central part of the City of Toronto. In addition to his regional responsibilities, he was Vicar for Lay Movements and Associations, Vicar for Ethnic Communities, and the liaison bishop for the Catholic School Chaplains of Ontario, the Catholic Association of Religious and Family Life Educators of Ontario, the Catholic Health Association of Ontario, and the Catholic Health Alliance of Canada.

On 8 April 2014, McGrattan was appointed 12th bishop of the Diocese of Peterborough, Ontario, and installed on 23 June 2014. He was appointed Bishop of Calgary, Alberta, Canada on 4 January 2017 but continued to serve as Apostolic Administrator until his successor was installed.

McGrattan is a member of the Canadian Conference of Catholic Bishops' Doctrine Commission, and Bishop Liaison for Catholic Health Alliance of Canada.

Religious timeline
 6 November 2009: Appointed Auxiliary Bishop for the Archdiocese of Toronto
 6 November 2009: Appointed Titular Bishop of Furnos Minor
 12 January 2010: Ordained Titular Bishop of Furnos Minor
 8 April 2014: Appointed Bishop of Peterborough, Ontario, Canada
 4 January 2017: Appointed Bishop of Calgary, Alberta, Canada

Professional experience
 1997–2009: Associate Professor, St. Peter's Seminary, London, Ontario
 Fundamental Moral Theology, Sacramental Theology, Religious Studies
 1994–1997: Assistant Professor, St. Peter's Seminary, London, Ontario
 Fundamental Moral Theology, Sacramental Theology, Religious Studies
 1992–1994: Lecturer, St. Peter's Seminary, London, Ontario
 1982–1987: Research Assistant, The University of Western Ontario, London, Ontario
 1979–1982: Chemical Engineer (P.Eng.), Polysar Limited, Sarnia, Ontario

References

1956 births
21st-century Roman Catholic bishops in Canada
Living people
University of Western Ontario alumni
People from London, Ontario
St. Peter's Seminary (Diocese of London, Ontario) alumni
Pontifical Gregorian University alumni
Roman Catholic bishops of Calgary
Roman Catholic bishops of Peterborough